Cubillo del Campo is a municipality located in the province of Burgos, Castile and León, Spain.

Geography 
Cubillo del Campo is a Spanish town located in the province of Burgos. The distance between Burgos and this town is about 22 km (13.7 mi). According to the 2021 census (INE), the municipality has a population of 102 inhabitants, and an area of 14.06 km² (5.43 sq mi).

Demographics

Economy 
Cubillo's population has always been dedicated to the agriculture, ranching and the extraction of stone in quarries. From these quarries, the stone of the Burgos Cathedral, among other monuments, were extracted. Within the municipality there are also two gravel extraction plants and a poultry farm, located inside an old military camp.

Tourism 
Cubillo del Campo is crossed by the national road N-234, which connects Sagunto (province of Valencia) and Sarracín (province of Burgos). This road is locally known as Soria's road. Many rural hiking routes cross this town, such as the Ruta del Buen Conde and the Ruta del Cid. The catering offer is reduced to Bar La Plaza, located in the Plaza de Santa Ana, in the centre of the town. Other tourist towns near to Cubillo del Campo are Burgos, Covarrubias, Lerma and Santo Domingo de Silos.

Policy 
Since 2018, the mayor is Francisco Javier Llama Navarro presented by the People's Party (Partido Popular, in Spanish). Previous mayors were Jesús Navarro Manero (2007-2018), Benjamín Alzaga (2003-2007), Carmelo Navarro (1995-2003), Daniel Blanco (1991-1995) or Ángel del Pino (1983-1991).

Neighborhood associations 
Currently, the village has two neighborhood associations, which are the association of retired people, called Santa Ana, and the association Friends of Cubillo del Campo (Amigos de Cubillo del Campo, in Spanish). These organizations are responsible of organizing cultural activities during the year. One of the most important activities organized by the association Friends of Cubillo del Campo is the Association Day (Día de la Asociación, in Spanish), in which a popular lunch is prepared and everybody is welcome to participate. During this day, people can enjoy different cultural activities, as well as an athletics competition, organized by Félix Hernando, ex-world champion marathon in veterans category.

Festivities 
The patron saint of this town is Santa Marina, whose feast is celebrated on July 18. In this date, this saint is paraded on the shoulders of the young men of the place. During this festivity, which takes place during all weekend, a popular lunch is organized. Also, people can enjoy different activities, such as musical performances, arts and cards competitions, as well as other local games, including bowling and tuta.

References

External links 
 Official website of the town hall

Municipalities in the Province of Burgos